Nasr is a given name and surname, more common as a surname, in the Arabic language. It may refer to:

Mononym
 Nasr I, Samanid amir ruled 864–892
 Nasr II, Samanid amir, ruled 914–943
 Nasr, Sultan of Granada (1287–1322), in the Nasrid dynasty

Given name
Nasr Abdel Aziz Eleyan (born 1941), Jordanian-Palestinian artist, television interior designer/producer
Nasr Abu Zayd (1943–2010), Egyptian Qur'anic thinker
Nasr ibn Sayyar (663–748), Arab general and the last Umayyad governor of Khurasan in 738–748
Nasr ibn Shabath al-Uqayli, early 9th-century rebel leader in the Jazira
Nasr Javed, Kashmiri senior operative of the militant group Lashkar-e-Taiba
Nasr Al-Madhkur, 18th century local governor of what was described by a contemporary account as an "independent state" of Bushire and Bahrain
Nasr El Hag Ali, the first vice chancellor of the University of Khartoum

Middle name
Alireza Nasr Azadani (born 1985), Iranian taekwondo player

Surname
Abu Yaqub Yusuf an-Nasr (died 1307), Marinid ruler of Morocco
Ali Nasr (1891-1961), Iranian dramatist and playwright 
Farouk Seif Al Nasr (1922–2009), Egyptian politician 
Felipe Nasr, Brazilian racing driver
Ghassan Nasr, academic and translator
Hassan Mustafa Osama Nasr, Egyptian cleric who was living in asylum in Italy until being allegedly abducted by the CIA
Kamila Nasr, Canadian singer, composer and multi-instrumentalist based in Beijing
May Nasr, Lebanese singer, musician and microfinancing consultant
Mahmoud Nasr, Egyptian cinematographer 
Mahmoud Abo El-Nasr (born 1953), Egyptian engineering professor, politician and minister
Muhammad Hamid Abu al-Nasr, a General Guide of the Egyptian Muslim Brotherhood
Octavia Nasr, Lebanese-American journalist
Ramsey Nasr (born 1974), Dutch-Palestinian author and actor
Rasha Nasr (born 1992), Syrian-German politician
Said Al Nasr, Syrian Palestinian, convicted in Belgium in 1980 for terrorism
Salah Nasr (1920–1982), head of the Egyptian General Intelligence Directorate from 1957 to 1967
Saleh Nasr (born 1999), Egyptian football player
Seyyed Hossein Nasr, Iranian professor in the department of Islamic studies at George Washington University
Suad Nasr (1953–2007), Egyptian stage, television, and film actress
Vali Reza Nasr, Iranian-born U.S. academic and scholar teaching at the Naval Postgraduate School
Yasman Malek-Nasr (also spelt Yassamin Maleknasr, born 1955), Iranian filmmaker and actress

See also
Nasr (disambiguation)
Naser (disambiguation)
Nasser (disambiguation)

Arabic masculine given names
Surnames of Egyptian origin
Surnames of Iranian origin
Surnames of Lebanese origin